Nqobile  is a given name. Notable people with the name include:

Nqobile Nunu Khumalo (born 1992), South African actress and model
Nqobile Ntuli (born 1996), South African field hockey player
Nqobile Sipamla (born 1984), South African actress, singer, and businesswoman

Bantu-language given